"A Planet Named Shayol" is a science fiction  story by American writer Cordwainer Smith (the pen name of Paul Linebarger). Like most of his science fiction work, it takes place in his Instrumentality of Mankind setting. It was first published in Galaxy Science Fiction magazine in October 1961.

In other media

Audio 
The story was adapted for radio by the Australian Broadcasting Corporation and broadcast in 1986.

Plot summary
The protagonist, Mercer, who lives within the Empire, has been convicted of "a crime that has no name". He is condemned by the Empire to the planet Shayol, in which he lives in a penal colony whose inhabitants must undergo grotesque physical mutations caused by tiny symbiotes called dromozoans. Most grow extra organs, which the Empire harvests for medical purposes. The bull-man B'dikkat administers the prisoners a drug called super-condamine to alleviate the pain of their punishment and from their surgeries.

More than a century pass. Mercer has found a lover, named Lady Da. B'dikkat shows the couple a sight that horrifies him. Children have been sent to Shayol, alive, though with their brains removed. Lady Da knows how to contact the Lords of the Instrumentality, in order to intervene. The Lords arrive on Shayol. They are shocked by what they find. The children are the heirs to the throne. Apparently, the Imperium has become so bureaucratic and corrupt that it condemned them to prevent them committing treason when they matured.

The Instrumentality voids their permission to allow the Empire to exist and to maintain Shayol. They will free the still sentient prisoners and to cure their suffering with a substitute for the super-condamine, namely an electronic "cap" which actives the pleasure center. The mindless prisoners are decapitated, leaving their bodies to be handled by the dromozoa while their heads are destroyed. Lady Da claims Mercer as her consort.

Commander Suzdal appeared in "The Crime and the Glory of Commander Suzdal", a story set earlier in fictional history than this one. It apparently takes place in the Bright Empire from other of the Instrumentality works.

References

External links
 
 

Short stories by Cordwainer Smith
1961 short stories
Works originally published in Galaxy Science Fiction
Science fiction horror
Body horror
Fiction set in prison
Mutants in fiction